Cristiani is a surname. Notable people with the surname include:

Alfredo Cristiani (born 1947), President of El Salvador
Gabriella Cristiani (born 1949), Italian film editor
Giovanni di Bartolomeo Cristiani, Tuscan painter
Quirino Cristiani (1896–1984), Argentine animation director
Stefano Cristiani (born 1958), Italian astronomer
Tony Cristiani, American football player